Argentina's charts are provided by the Argentine Chamber of Phonograms and Videograms Producers (CAPIF) and Monitor Latino. While the former one provides monthly charts on physical album and digital singles sales.

Albums
This is a list of the number-one hits of 2018 on the Argentina's Albums Charts chart, ranked by the Argentine Chamber of Phonograms and Videograms Producers (CAPIF).

Singles
This is a list of the number-one hits of 2018 on the Argentina's Singles Charts chart, ranked by the Argentine Chamber of Phonograms and Videograms Producers (CAPIF).

See also
 2018 in music
 Argentina Hot 100
 List of Billboard Argentina Hot 100 number-one singles of 2018
 List of airplay number-one hits of the 2010s (Argentina)

References

Argentina
2018